Kenneth Swalwell (born c. 1930) was a Canadian football player who played for the BC Lions, as well as a discus thrower. He played college football at Western Washington University.

References

Living people
1930s births
American football halfbacks
Canadian football running backs
Western Washington Vikings football players
Canadian male discus throwers
Athletes (track and field) at the 1954 British Empire and Commonwealth Games
BC Lions players
Commonwealth Games competitors for Canada